Altergaz was the first French independent natural gas company in France, based in Paris and founded by Taoufik Tahar, Robert Delbos and Jean-Paul George in 2003. In 2012, Eni, the Italian Oil & Gas multinational acquired Altergaz.

History
Altergaz was initially founded in 2003 by Taoufik Tahar and two former senior executive of French energy sectors: Robert Delbos and Jean-Paul George. Taoufik Tahar was the founder and CEO of Easyloan first credit broker in France. Robert Delbos was Chief of Treasury and CFO of EDF-GDF (today EDF and Engie) and then Chairman-CEO of Petrofigaz (today Solfea bank). Jean-Paul George was the former number 2 of GDF (today Engie) as sales manager in the 90s and the founder-CEO of Cofathec group (today Engie Cofely).

In 2004, the investor Georges Cohen, founder of Transiciel company joined Altergaz as business angel and became associate.

In 2005, Altergaz was listed on Bourse de Paris stock exchange.

In 2012, the turnover of Altergaz was around €1,6 billion.

Partnership with Eni
From 2007, Altergaz created a strong industrial and financial partnership with the Italian oil and gas multinational Eni. From 2010, Eni is the first shareholder of Altergaz with more than 63% of the capital and in 2011 Eni got around 98% of shares.

Altergaz became Eni
The October 1st 2012, Eni acquired Altergaz in full and was renamed Eni Gas & Power France.

References

External links
 Official website

Natural gas companies of France
French companies established in 2003